Phytelephas schottii, the corozo palm, is a palm tree native to Colombia which bears a fruit which in Colombia is called corozo. The corozo fruit is often made into a sweet beverage called jugo de corozo.

References

External links

schottii
Flora of Colombia